Tywardreath Highway is a hamlet in Cornwall, England, located near the village of St Blazey. 

Originally a small mining hamlet, after expansion during the 20th century, Tywardreath Highway now directly adjoins St Blazey and is within the same electoral district. The hamlet contains around 70 houses.

References

Hamlets in Cornwall
St Blazey